1860 Constitution was the Constitution of Costa Rica for two years, between 1869 and 1871.

History

The pronouncement of November 1, 1868, proclaimed Jesús Jiménez Zamora as provisional president. On November 3, Jiménez called elections for a Constituent Assembly, which began its sessions on January 1, 1869, under the presidency of Juan José Ulloa Solares. A commission of constituents drafted the project for the new Constitution, for which the text of the Constitution of 1859 served as a model, to which only a few slight adjustments and additions were made. The new Fundamental Charter was approved by the constituent body. February 18, 1869, although it was not put into effect until April 18 of that year.

Under the rule of the Constitution of 1869, the president Jiménez Zamora was popularly elected as constitutional president for the period 1869-1872. However, the validity of the new Charter ended on April 27, 1870, when President Jiménez was overthrown by a military coup and the constitutional order was broken yet again.

Content

The Political Constitution of 1869 consisted of 149 articles distributed in thirteen titles.

 Title I dealt with the Republic, declared that sovereignty resided in the nation and indicated the limits of Costa Rica.

 Title II dealt with the government, indicated its characteristics and enunciated the tripartite division of branches.

 Title III referred to Religion and said that the Catholic was that of the Republic, that it was protected by the Government and that it did not contribute with its revenues to the expenses of another worship, whose exercise, however, it tolerated. 

 Title IV related to education, and declared that primary education of both sexes was compulsory, free and paid for by the State.

 Title V referred to national and individual guarantees and repeated almost literally what was stated on the subject in the Constitution of 1859.

 Title VI contained the regulation of nationality and citizenship.

 Title VII referred to suffrage, which was exercised through an indirect system in two grades. The second degree of the suffrage was censitario and of him the priests were excluded.

 The titles VIII and IX regulated the Legislative and the Executive branches respectively, practically in the same terms that in the previous Constitution. There was nevertheless an important change with respect to the Council of State, that happened to be formed by the Secretaries of State and the Presidents of both Houses and it was also indicated that their opinion was purely advisory and should be extended in writing.

 Title X referred to the Judiciary and regulated various aspects of the administration of justice, almost identical to the Constitution of 1859. However, an important innovation was introduced, since it ordered that by an absolute majority of votes the Supreme Court of Justice could suspend, by itself, at the request of the Prosecutor or any citizen, the enforcement of laws that were contrary to the Constitution, and submit their observations on the matter to the Congress at its next ordinary meeting, so that it could be definitively resolved.

 Title XI dealt with the Public Prosecutor's Office, headed by a General Prosecutor appointed by Congress for two-year terms and with the possibility of being re-elected. The prosecutor was responsible for ensuring that public officials performed their duties properly and accused them before whom it corresponds.

 Title XII dealt with the municipal regime and reproduced the provisions of the Constitution of 1859 on political division, provincial governors and municipalities.

 Title XII referred to the observance of the Constitution and reforms to the fundamental Charter. At the beginning of its ordinary sessions, the Legislative branch had to examine whether the Constitution had been exactly observed and provide what was convenient to enforce the responsibility of the offenders. For the partial reform of the Constitution a project could be presented in any of the chambers, signed by at least one third of the members present, and then had to be approved by two thirds of votes in each of the Chambers and by an absolute majority of the Congress. The project then went to the Executive, who after having heard the Council of State, presented it with its annual message to the Congress at the next ordinary meeting of the latter. The Congress then had to approve again the modification by two thirds of votes. It could also proceed to reform the Constitution by unanimous initiative of the Municipalities of the Republic. For the general reform of the Constitution it was necessary to convene a Constituent Assembly, after the respective project followed the procedures of partial reform.

References

Constitutions of Costa Rica